The Kingmaker's Daughter is a 2012 historical novel by Philippa Gregory, part of her series The Cousins' War. It is the story of Anne Neville, wife of Richard III of England. The 2013 BBC One television series The White Queen is a 10-part adaptation of Gregory's novels The White Queen (2009), The Red Queen (2010) and The Kingmaker's Daughter, and features Faye Marsay as Anne Neville.

Plot 
Richard Neville, 16th Earl of Warwick—called "The Kingmaker"—puts young Edward IV on the throne of England. But before Neville can arrange for one of his daughters to marry the new king, Edward marries Elizabeth Woodville in secret. As Neville begins losing his control of Edward, he plots to secure his daughters' futures.

Anne, his younger daughter, is married off to Edward, Prince of Wales. Following the  deaths in battle of both her father and her husband, she is courted by the future King Richard III of England.

Critical reception 
Publishers Weekly wrote of the novel, "In addition to Gregory handling a complicated history, she convincingly details women’s lives in the 1400s and the competitive love between sisters."

AudioFile magazine gave its Earphones Award to the audiobook recording of The Kingmaker's Daughter, calling the novel "another fascinating perspective of the behind-the-scene machinations of the War of the Roses" and praising narrator Bianca Amato as "simply outstanding as Anne sheds her innocence."

Adaptations 

 The White Queen (2013), drama directed by Colin Teague, James Kent and Jamie Payne, based on novels The White Queen, The Red Queen and The Kingmaker's Daughter

References

External links 
 
 
 

2012 British novels
Historical novels
British novels adapted into television shows
Cultural depictions of English monarchs
Richard III of England
Novels by Philippa Gregory
Novels set in the 15th century
Works about women in war
Simon & Schuster books